The Men's 200m Individual Medley event at the 2003 Pan American Games took place on August 17, 2003 (Day 16 of the Games).

Medalists

Records

Results

Notes

References
swimmingworldmagazine
swimmingworldmagazine
swimmers-world
SwimNews Results

Medley, Men's 200m